Singhpur is a village and corresponding community development block in Tiloi tehsil of Rae Bareli district, Uttar Pradesh, India. As of 2011, its population is 2,826, in 549 households. It is located 16 km from Tiloi, the tehsil headquarters, and 20 km from the town of Maharajganj. The main staple foods are wheat and rice.

The 1961 census recorded Singhpur as comprising 11 hamlets, with a total population of 1,179 people (617 male and 562 female), in 303 households and 296 physical houses. The area of the village was given as 998 acres.

The 1981 census recorded Singhpur as having a population of 1,418 people, in 317 households, and having an area of 396.60 hectares.

Villages
Singhpur CD block has the following 74 villages:

References

Villages in Raebareli district